Portal is a surname. Notable people with the surname include: 

 Abraham Portal (1726–1809), English goldsmith and dramatist
 Alejandro Portal (born 1995), Cuban footballer
 Alex Portal (born 2002), French Paralympic swimmer
 Alexia Portal, French actress
 Antoine Portal (1742–1832), French anatomist, doctor and medical historian
 Charles Portal, 1st Viscount Portal of Hungerford (1893–1971), British air force officer
 Enrique del Portal (1932–2020), Spanish tenor and actor
 Sir Gerald Portal (1858–1894), British colonial diplomat
 Jane Portal (born 1955), British art historian and curator
 Jean-Michel Portal (born 1970), French actor
 Louise Portal (born 1950), Canadian actress
 Magda Portal (1900–1989), Peruvian poet, author and activist
 Manuel Vázquez Portal (born 1951), Cuban journalist and poet
 Marta Portal (1930–2016), Spanish writer, critic, journalist and academic
 Melville Portal (1819–1904), British politician and father of Gerald Portal
 Michel Portal (born 1935), French composer, saxophonist, and clarinetist
 Nicolas Portal (1979–2020), French cyclist
 Sir Reginald Henry Portal (1894–1983), British naval officer
 Robert Portal (born 1967/68), English actor
 Sébastien Portal (born 1982), French cyclist
 Stanley Portal Hyatt (1877–1914), English explorer, hunter and writer
 Wyndham Portal, 1st Viscount Portal (1885–1949), British businessman and public servant